Aleksandr Aleksandrovich Samokhvalov (born 15 April 1984) is a former Russian professional football player.

Club career
He played 5 seasons in the Russian Football National League for 4 different teams.

External links
 

1984 births
Footballers from Saint Petersburg
Living people
Russian footballers
Association football goalkeepers
FC Dynamo Saint Petersburg players
FC Sheksna Cherepovets players
FC Volga Nizhny Novgorod players
FC Neftekhimik Nizhnekamsk players
FC Sokol Saratov players
FC Tekstilshchik Ivanovo players
FC Petrotrest players
FC Sakhalin Yuzhno-Sakhalinsk players
FC Torpedo Vladimir players